Aldeburgh Hall Pit is a one hectare geological Site of Special Scientific Interest in Aldeburgh in Suffolk. It is a Geological Conservation Review site, and it is in the Suffolk Coast and Heaths Area of Outstanding Natural Beauty.

This site has very fossiliferous rocks of the early Pliocene Coralline Crag Formation around five million years ago. The Bryozoan fauna are rich and diverse, and the stratification may indicate the interior of an offshore sandbank.

The site is private land with no public access.

References

Sites of Special Scientific Interest in Suffolk
Geological Conservation Review sites
Aldeburgh